The  was the first season of the nationwide fourth tier of Japanese football, and the 16th season since the establishment of Japan Football League. The first stage of the season commenced from 16 March to 8 June, and the second stage of the season commenced on 19 July, and ended on 9 November, while post-season championship playoffs were held on 23 and 30 November.

Honda FC defeated SP Kyoto FC in the final series, winning their first title since 2008, and fifth in JFL overall. Meanwhile, Renofa Yamaguchi won promotion to J3 League after it has finished 4th in the table and fulfilled all licensing criteria set by J. League.

Clubs
After 10 of 18 teams were set to leave JFL for newly created J3, the league announced that it would suffer a contraction and only 14 teams would participate in 2014. The league would accommodate all winners of the Regional League promotion series and would accept applications from another Regional clubs that are willing to participate in the nationwide league. On 4 December 2013 the league announced the final list of promoted teams.

Change in rules
The league will turn to two-stage format, similar to the one J. League had in its early years and is planning to reintroduce in 2015. Two single round-robin stages will be held, and winners of each stage will determine the champion in the post-season home and away championship playoffs. If the same team manages to win both stages, no playoffs will be held, and they will be automatically declared champions.

No relegation is expected to take place in 2014 season, as the league anticipates expansion to 16 teams in 2015.

According to updated J. League Terms, in order to be promoted to J3 League the clubs must comply the following requirements:
Play in JFL for at least one season before promotion
Hold a J. League 100 Year Plan club status
Finish in top 4 of the combined JFL table, and finish either 1st or 2nd among associate members
Have an average home attendance of at least 2,000; with significant effort recognized toward reaching 3,000 spectators
Have an annual operating revenue of 150 million yen
Pass the J3 licensing examination conducted by J. League

First stage

Table

Results

Second stage

Table

Results

Championship play-offs
The championship play-offs was held after the season between two winners of each stage. Honda FC, the winners of the first stage, will host the first leg on 23 November, and SP Kyoto FC who won the second stage will host the second leg on 29 November.

Honda FC won the series 5–4 on aggregate and thus won their 5th JFL title.

Overall table
This table was used to determine J3 promotion candidates. To qualify for promotion, a club must hold a 100 Year Plan status (marked in bold in the table), and finish both in Top-4 of the JFL, and either 1st or 2nd among the promotion-eligible clubs.

On 21 October the J. League has examined clubs in order to determine J3 promotion eligibility. Among existing 100 Year Plan clubs only Azul Claro Numazu and Renofa Yamaguchi passed all tests, making them the only clubs theoretically eligible for promotion.

On 19 November J. League officially admitted Renofa Yamaguchi to participate in next year J3 League.

Top scorers

Source: Japan Football League
Updated to games played on 9 November 2014

Attendance

Promotion from regional leagues
As the league plans to expand to 16 teams for 2015 season, two promotion slots were available for the winners of the Regional League promotion series. In the final group tournament that took place from 22 to 24 November Nara Club and FC Osaka finished first and second, respectively, and won promotion to 2015 JFL.

Due to promotion of Renofa Yamaguchi to J3 League, one additional promotion spot become available. On 10 December it was awarded to Club Dragons from Kansai League D2 who finished third in the Regional Promotion series.

References

External links
Official website

2014
4